Bionic Commando: Elite Forces is a video game released in 2000 for the Game Boy Color. Though the game is part of the Bionic Commando series of games by Capcom, Elite Forces is the only game in the series to be published by Nintendo, and was the first title to be developed by its Redmond-based first-party studio Nintendo Software Technology. It is the sequel to the Game Boy version of Bionic Commando, which launched worldwide in 1992, though it was only ever released in North America and Australia; however, in November 2014, the game launched for the Nintendo 3DS Virtual Console service in Europe, again published by Nintendo.

Gameplay

Though the player still cannot jump, Elite Forces is different from the rest of the Bionic Commando series; among the changes are a different plot, new moves for the main characters - an unnamed female commando and an unnamed male commando - and the ability to utilize a sniper rifle in some segments of the game.

The game features stages arranged on a map screen akin to Super Mario 3, with some levels being traditional side scrolling platformers, with others being top-down shooters, or auto-scroller segments. The player receives exposition from "codec" calls, and may also choose specific items or weapons before levels.

There are a few bosses placed in large arenas, and ending slideshow with captions immediately following the final boss.

Plot
The peaceful land of Karinia is being terrorized by an evil man named Arturus. He is the leader of an evil army called the Avars, who have terrorized Karinia for years. As the Elite Forces fight the Avars, they receive a fragmented communication from Commander Joe (presumably Super Joe), an ally who had infiltrated their territory. Joe's message revealed that Arturus was planning to launch the Albatross Project. After that, communication with Cmdr. Joe was lost. The Bionic Corps contacted the Elite Forces to help stop the Avars, prevent the fall of Karinia, and rescue Joe. It is essentially a repeat of the events of the 1988 Bionic Commando, except with a different twist by the end - rather than the resurrection of a long-dead dictator, it is revealed that the Albatross was originally a wrecked space vessel of unknown origin that can give its owner mutant powers.

Reception

The game received "favorable" reviews according to the review aggregation website GameRankings.

See also
 Bionic Commando, for other games in the series.

References

External links
 

2000 video games
Bionic Commando
Game Boy Color games
Metroidvania games
Nintendo games
Nintendo Software Technology games
Platform games
Post-apocalyptic video games
Side-scrolling video games
Video games about cyborgs
Video games developed in the United States
Video games featuring female protagonists
Virtual Console games